The 330th Fighter-Interceptor Squadron is an inactive United States Air Force unit.  Its last assignment was with the 329th Fighter Group at Stewart Air Force Base, New York, where it was inactivated on 1 July 1959.

History

World War II
Trained replacement pilots, September 1942 – March 1944; furnished cadres for fighter squadrons, January–December 1943.; served as part of air defense force for the west coast, 1943.

Cold War air defense
Air defense of the Northeastern United States, 1954–1967.

Lineage
 Constituted as the 330th Fighter Squadron (Two Engine) on 24 June 1942
 Activated on 10 July 1942
 Disbanded on 31 March 1944
 Reconstituted and redesignated 330th Fighter-Interceptor Squadron on 14 November 1952
 Activated on 27 November 1952
 Inactivated on 1 July 1959

Assignments
 329th Fighter Group, 10 July 1942 – 31 March 1944
 4709th Defense (later Air Defense) Wing, 27 November 1952
 4700th Air Defense Group, 20 September 1954
 329th Fighter Group, 18 August 1955 – 1 July 1959

Stations
 Hamilton Field, California, 10 July 1942
 Paine Field, Washington, 14 July 1942
 Glendale Army Air Base, California, 10 September 1942
 Lindbergh Field, California, 2 November 1942 – 31 March 1944
 Stewart Air Force Base, New York, 27 November 1952 – 1 July 1959

Aircraft
 Lockheed P-38 Lightning, 1942–1944
 Lockheed F-80 Shooting Star, 1952–1953
 North American F-86D Sabre, 1953–1959

References

 Notes

 Citations

Bibliography

External links

330
Military units and formations established in 1952
Aerospace Defense Command units